Leo John Burke (10 September 1891 – 8 November 1957) was an Australian rules footballer who played with Richmond in the Victorian Football League (VFL).

Notes

External links 

1891 births
1957 deaths
Australian rules footballers from Melbourne
Richmond Football Club players
People from Kew, Victoria